District 6 of the Oregon State Senate comprises southwestern Linn County and north-central Lane County. It is currently represented by Democrat Lee Beyer of Springfield.

Election results
District boundaries have changed over time, therefore, senators before 2013 may not represent the same constituency as today. From 1993 until 2003, the district covered western Multnomah County, and from 2003 until 2013 it covered a slightly different area in the southern Willamette Valley.

References

06
Lane County, Oregon
Linn County, Oregon